The Atlantic City Blackjacks were a professional arena football team based in Atlantic City, New Jersey, that played in the Arena Football League (AFL) in 2019.

History
Home games were played at Boardwalk Hall. The team was operated by Trifecta Sports and Entertainment, the same ownership group as the Albany Empire and Philadelphia Soul. On January 31, the team announced two-time AFL coach of the year Ron James as its inaugural head coach. After a name-the-team contest, the name Blackjacks was announced on March 7. After the Blackjacks' first season, the entire league ceased operations.

Coaches and personnel

Head coaches

Staff

Season-by-season results

References

External links
Official website

 
American football teams in New Jersey
Arena Football League
American football teams established in 2019
Defunct American football teams in New Jersey
2019 establishments in New Jersey
2019 in sports in New Jersey
Sports in Atlantic City, New Jersey